Elia Kazan (born Elias Kazantzoglou; September 7, 1909 – September 28, 2003) was an American film and theatre director, producer, screenwriter and actor, described by The New York Times as "one of the most honored and influential directors in Broadway and Hollywood history".

Born in Constantinople (now Istanbul), to Cappadocian Greek parents, his family came to the United States in 1913. After attending Williams College and then the Yale School of Drama, he acted professionally for eight years, later joining the Group Theatre in 1932, and co-founded the Actors Studio in 1947. With Robert Lewis and Cheryl Crawford, his actors' studio introduced "Method Acting" under the direction of Lee Strasberg. Kazan acted in a few films, including City for Conquest (1940).

His films were concerned with personal or social issues of special concern to him. Kazan writes, "I don't move unless I have some empathy with the basic theme." His first such "issue" film was Gentleman's Agreement (1947), with Gregory Peck, which dealt with antisemitism in America. It received eight Oscar nominations and three wins, including Kazan's first for Best Director. It was followed by Pinky (1949), one of the first films in mainstream Hollywood to address racial prejudice against African Americans. A Streetcar Named Desire (1951), an adaptation of the stage play which he had also directed, received twelve Oscar nominations, winning four, and was Marlon Brando's breakthrough role. Three years later, he directed Brando again in On the Waterfront, a film about union corruption on the New York harbor waterfront. It also received 12 Oscar nominations, winning eight. In 1955, he directed John Steinbeck's East of Eden, which introduced James Dean to movie audiences.

A turning point in Kazan's career came with his testimony as a witness before the House Committee on Un-American Activities in 1952 at the time of the Hollywood blacklist, which brought him strong negative reactions from many friends and colleagues. His testimony helped end the careers of former acting colleagues Morris Carnovsky and Art Smith, along with the work of playwright Clifford Odets. Kazan and Odets had made a pact to name each other in front of the committee. Kazan later justified his act by saying he took "only the more tolerable of two alternatives that were either way painful and wrong." Nearly a half-century later, his anti-Communist testimony continued to cause controversy. When Kazan was awarded an honorary Oscar in 1999, dozens of actors chose not to applaud as 250 demonstrators picketed the event.

Kazan influenced the films of the 1950s and 1960s with his provocative, issue-driven subjects. Director Stanley Kubrick called him, "without question, the best director we have in America, [and] capable of performing miracles with the actors he uses." Film author Ian Freer concludes that even "if his achievements are tainted by political controversy, the debt Hollywood—and actors everywhere—owes him is enormous." In 2010, Martin Scorsese co-directed the documentary film A Letter to Elia as a personal tribute to Kazan.

Early life
Elia Kazan was born in the Kadıköy district of Constantinople (now Istanbul), to Cappadocian Greek parents, originally from Kayseri in Anatolia. He arrived in the United States with his parents, George and Athena Kazantzoglou (née Shishmanoglou), on July 8, 1913. He was named after his paternal grandfather, Elia Kazantzoglou. His maternal grandfather was Isaak Shishmanoglou. Elia's brother, Avraam, was born in Berlin and later became a psychiatrist.

Kazan was raised in the Greek Orthodox Church and attended Greek Orthodox services every Sunday, where he had to stand for several hours with his father. His mother read the Bible but did not go to church. When Kazan was about eight years old, the family moved to New Rochelle, New York, and his father sent him to a Roman Catholic catechism school because there was no Orthodox church nearby.

As a young boy, he was remembered as being shy, and his college classmates described him as more of a loner. Much of his early life was portrayed in his autobiographical book, America America, which he made into a film in 1963. In it, he describes his family as "alienated" from both their parents' Greek Orthodox values and from those of mainstream America. His mother's family were cotton merchants who imported cotton from England and sold it wholesale. His father had become a rug merchant after immigrating to the United States and expected that his son would go into the same business.

After attending public schools through high school, Kazan enrolled at Williams College in Massachusetts, where he helped pay his way by waiting tables and washing dishes; he still graduated cum laude. He also worked as a bartender at various fraternities, but never joined one. While a student at Williams, he earned the nickname "Gadg", for Gadget, because, he said, "I was small, compact, and handy to have around." The nickname was eventually taken up by his stage and film stars.

In America America he tells how, and why, his family left Turkey and moved to America. Kazan notes that much of it came from stories that he heard as a young boy. He says during an interview that "it's all true: the wealth of the family was put on the back of a donkey, and my uncle, really still a boy, went to Istanbul ... to gradually bring the family there to escape the oppressive circumstances ... It's also true that he lost the money on the way, and when he got there he swept rugs in a little store."

Kazan noted some of the controversial aspects of what he put in the film. He wrote "I used to say to myself when I was making the film that America was a dream of total freedom in all areas." To make his point, the character who portrays Kazan's uncle Avraam kisses the ground when he gets through customs, while the Statue of Liberty and the American flag are in the background. Kazan had considered whether that kind of scene might be too much for American audiences:

Before undertaking the film, Kazan wanted to confirm many of the details about his family's background. At one point, he sat his parents down and recorded their answers to his questions. He remembers eventually asking his father a "deeper question: 'Why America? What were you hoping for? His mother gave him the answer, however: "A.E. brought us here." Kazan states that "A.E. was my uncle Avraam Elia, the one who left the Anatolian village with the donkey. At twenty-eight, somehow—this was the wonder—he made his way to New York. He sent home money and in time brought my father over. Father sent for my mother and my baby brother and me when I was four."

Kazan wrote of the film, "It's my favorite of all the films I've made; the first film that was entirely mine."

Career

1930s: Stage career 

In 1932, after spending two years at the Yale University School of Drama, he moved to New York City to become a professional stage actor. He continued his professional studies at the Juilliard School where he studied singing with Lucia Dunham. His first opportunity came with a small group of actors engaged in presenting plays containing "social commentary". They were called the Group Theatre, which showcased many lesser known plays with deep social or political messages. After struggling to be accepted by them, he discovered his first strong sense of self in America within the "family of the Group Theatre, and more loosely in the radical social and cultural movements of the time", writes film author Joanna E. Rapf.

In Kazan's autobiography, he writes of the "lasting impact on him of the Group", noting in particular, Lee Strasberg and Harold Clurman as "father figures", along with his close friendship with playwright Clifford Odets. Kazan, during an interview with Michel Ciment, describes the Group:

Kazan, in his autobiography, also describes Strasberg as a vital leader of the group:

Kazan's first national success came as a New York theatrical director. Although initially he worked as an actor on stage, and told early in his acting career that he had no acting ability, he surprised many critics by becoming one of the Group's most capable actors. In 1935 he played the role of a strike-leading taxi driver in a drama by Clifford Odets, Waiting for Lefty, and his performance was called "dynamic", leading some to describe him as the "proletarian thunderbolt".

Among the themes that would run through all of his work were "personal alienation and an outrage over social injustice", writes film critic William Baer. Other critics have likewise noted his "strong commitment to the social and social psychological—rather than the purely political—implications of drama".

By the mid-1930s, when he was 26, he began directing a number of the Group Theatre's plays, including Robert Ardrey's well-known play Thunder Rock. In 1942 he achieved his first notable success by directing a play by Thornton Wilder, The Skin of Our Teeth, starring Tallulah Bankhead and Fredric March. The play, though controversial, was a critical and commercial success and won Wilder a Pulitzer Prize. Kazan won the New York Drama Critics Award for Best Director and Bankhead for best actress. Kazan then went on to direct Death of a Salesman by Arthur Miller, and then directed A Streetcar Named Desire by Tennessee Williams, both of which were also successful. Kazan's wife, Molly Thacher, the reader for the Group, discovered Williams and awarded him a "prize that launched his career".

The Group Theatre's summer rehearsal headquarters was at Pine Brook Country Club, located in the countryside of Nichols, Connecticut, during the 1930s and early 1940s. Along with Kazan were numerous other artists: Harry Morgan, John Garfield, Luise Rainer, Frances Farmer, Will Geer, Howard da Silva, Clifford Odets, Lee J. Cobb and Irwin Shaw.

1940s: The Actors Studio, early films 
In 1940, Kazan had a large supporting role as a flamboyantly dressed gangster in the boxing thriller City for Conquest starring James Cagney, Ann Sheridan and Anthony Quinn. His stylishly distinctive but raffish clothing seems to have been copied by Frank Sinatra a decade and a half later and his part is both sympathetic and extremely dramatic.

In 1947, he founded the Actors Studio, a non-profit workshop, with actors Robert Lewis and Cheryl Crawford. In 1951, Lee Strasberg became its director after Kazan left for Hollywood to focus on his career as a movie director. It remained a non-profit enterprise. Strasberg introduced the "Method" to the Actors Studio, an umbrella term for a constellation of systemizations of Konstantin Stanislavski's teachings. The "Method" school of acting became the predominant system of post-World War II Hollywood.

Among Strasberg's students were Montgomery Clift, Mildred Dunnock, Julie Harris, Karl Malden, Patricia Neal, Maureen Stapleton, Eli Wallach, and James Whitmore. 
Kazan directed two of the Studio's protégés, Karl Malden and Marlon Brando, in the Tennessee Williams play A Streetcar Named Desire.

Though at the height of his stage success, Kazan turned to Hollywood as a director of motion pictures. He first directed two short films, but his first feature film was A Tree Grows in Brooklyn (1945), one of his first attempts to film dramas focused on contemporary concerns, which later became his forte. Two years later he directed Gentleman's Agreement, where he tackled a seldom-discussed topic in America, antisemitism, for which he won his first Oscar as Best Director. In 1947, he directed the courtroom drama Boomerang!. In 1949 he again dealt with a controversial subject when he directed Pinky, which dealt with issues of racism in America, and was nominated for three Academy Awards.

1950s: Rise to prominence 
In 1950 he directed Panic in the Streets, starring Richard Widmark, in a thriller shot on the streets of New Orleans. In that film, Kazan experimented with a documentary style of cinematography, which succeeded in "energizing" the action scenes. He won the Venice Film Festival International Award as director, and the film also won two Academy Awards. Kazan had requested that Zero Mostel also act in the film, despite Mostel being "blacklisted" as a result of HCUA testimony a few years earlier. Kazan writes of his decision:

In 1951, after introducing and directing Marlon Brando and Karl Malden in the stage version, he went on to cast both in the film version of the play, A Streetcar Named Desire, which won four Oscars, being nominated for 12.

Despite these plaudits, the film was considered a step back cinematically with the feel of filmed theater, though Kazan did at first use a more open setting, but he then felt compelled to revert to the stage atmosphere to remain true to the script. He explains:

Kazan's next film was Viva Zapata! (1952) which also starred Marlon Brando. This time the film added real atmosphere with the use of location shots and strong character accents. Kazan called this his "first real film" because of those factors.

In 1954 he again used Brando as a star in On the Waterfront. As a continuation of the socially relevant themes that he developed in New York, the film exposed corruption within New York's longshoremen's union. It too was nominated for 12 Academy Awards, and won 8, including Best Picture, Best Director and Best Actor, for Marlon Brando.

On the Waterfront was also the screen debut for Eva Marie Saint, who won the Oscar for Best Supporting Actress for her role. Saint recalls that Kazan selected her for the role after he had her do an improvisational skit with Brando playing the other character. She had no idea that he was looking to fill any particular film part, however, but remembers that Kazan set up the scenario with Brando which brought out surprising emotions:

Life magazine described On the Waterfront as the "most brutal movie of the year" but with "the year's tenderest love scenes", and stating that Saint was a "new discovery" in films. In its cover story about Saint, it speculated that it will probably be as Edie in On the Waterfront that she "starts her real trip to fame".

The film made use of extensive on-location street scenes and waterfront shots, and included a notable score by noted composer Leonard Bernstein.

After the success of On the Waterfront, he went on to direct another screen adaptation of a John Steinbeck novel, East of Eden (1955). As director, Kazan again used another unknown actor, James Dean. Kazan had seen Dean on stage in New York and after an audition gave him the starring role along with an exclusive contract with Warner Bros. Dean flew back to Los Angeles with Kazan in 1954, the first time he had ever flown in a plane, bringing his clothes in a brown paper bag. The film's success introduced James Dean to the world and established him as a popular actor. He went on to star in Rebel Without a Cause (1955), directed by Kazan's friend Nicholas Ray, and then Giant (1956), directed by George Stevens.

Author Douglas Rathgeb describes the difficulties Kazan had in turning Dean into a new star, noting how Dean was a controversial figure at Warner Bros. from the time he arrived. There were rumors that he "kept a loaded gun in his studio trailer; that he drove his motorcycle dangerously down studio streets or sound stages; that he had bizarre and unsavory friends." As a result, Kazan was forced to "baby-sit the young actor in side-by-side trailers", so he would not run away during production. Co-star Julie Harris worked overtime to quell Dean's panic attacks. In general, Dean was oblivious to Hollywood's methods, and Rathgeb notes that "his radical style did not mesh with Hollywood's corporate gears".

Dean was amazed at his own performance on screen when he later viewed a rough cut of the film. Kazan had invited director Nicholas Ray to a private showing, with Dean, as Ray was looking for someone to play the lead in Rebel Without a Cause. Ray watched Dean's powerful acting on the screen; but it seemed impossible that it was the same person in the room. Ray felt Dean was shy and totally withdrawn as he sat there hunched over. "Dean himself did not seem to believe it", notes Rathgeb. "He watched himself with an odd, almost adolescent fascination, as if he were admiring someone else." The film also made good use of on-location and outdoor scenes, along with effective use of early widescreen format, making the film one of Kazan's most accomplished works. James Dean died the following year, at the age of 24, in an accident with his sports car outside of Los Angeles. He had only made three films, and the only completed film he ever saw was East of Eden.

1960s: Continued work 

In 1961, Kazan introduced Warren Beatty in his first screen appearance with a starring role in Splendor in the Grass (1961), with Natalie Wood; the film was nominated for two Oscars and won one. Author Peter Biskind points out that Kazan "was the first in a string of major directors Beatty sought out, mentors or father figures from whom he wanted to learn." Biskind notes also that they "were wildly dissimilar—mentor vs. protégé, director vs. actor, immigrant outsider vs. native son. Kazan was armed with the confidence born of age and success, while Beatty was virtually aflame with the arrogance of youth." Kazan recalls his impressions of Beatty:

Biskind describes an episode during the first week of shooting, where Beatty was angered at something Kazan said: "The star lashed out at the spot where he knew Kazan was most vulnerable, the director's friendly testimony before the HCUA. He snapped, 'Lemme ask you something—why did you name all those names?

Beatty recalled the episode: "In some patricidal attempt to stand up to the great Kazan, I arrogantly and stupidly challenged him on it." Biskind describes how "Kazan grabbed his arm, asking, 'What did you say?' and dragged him off to a tiny dressing room ... whereupon the director proceeded to justify himself for two hours." Beatty, years later, during a Kennedy Center tribute to Kazan, stated to the audience that Kazan "had given him the most important break in his career".

Beatty's costar, Natalie Wood, was in a transition period in her career, having mostly been cast in roles as a child or teenager, and she was now hoping to be cast in adult roles. Biographer Suzanne Finstad notes that a "turning point" in her life as an actress was upon seeing the film A Streetcar Named Desire: "She was transformed, in awe of Kazan and of Vivien Leigh's performance ... [who] became a role model for Natalie." In 1961, after a "series of bad films, her career was already in decline", notes Rathgeb. Kazan writes that the "sages" of the film community declared her as "washed up" as an actress, although he still wanted to interview her for his next film:

Kazan cast her as the female lead in Splendor in the Grass, and her career rebounded. Finstad feels that despite Wood never receiving training in Method acting techniques, "working with Kazan brought her to the greatest emotional heights of her career. The experience was exhilarating but wrenching for Natalie, who faced her demons on Splendor." She adds that a scene in the film, as a result of "Kazan's wizardry ... produced a hysteria in Natalie that may be her most powerful moment as an actress."

Actor Gary Lockwood, who also acted in the film, felt that "Kazan and Natalie were a terrific marriage, because you had this beautiful girl, and you had somebody that could get things out of her." Kazan's favorite scene in the movie was the last one, when Wood goes back to see her lost first love, Bud (Beatty). "It's terribly touching to me. I still like it when I see it", writes Kazan. "And I certainly didn't need to tell her how to play it. She understood it perfectly."

Collaborators 
Kazan was noted for his close collaboration with screenwriters. On Broadway, he worked with Arthur Miller, Tennessee Williams, and William Inge; in film, he worked again with Willams (A Streetcar Named Desire and Baby Doll), Inge (Splendor in the Grass), Budd Schulberg (On the Waterfront and A Face in the Crowd), John Steinbeck (Viva Zapata!), and Harold Pinter (The Last Tycoon). As an instrumental figure in the careers of many of the best writers of his time, "he always treated them and their work with the utmost respect." In 2009, a previously unproduced screenplay by Williams, The Loss of a Teardrop Diamond, was released as a film. Williams wrote the screenplay specifically for Kazan to direct during the 1950s.

Williams became one of Kazan's closest and most loyal friends, and Kazan often pulled Williams out of "creative slumps" by redirecting his focus with new ideas. In 1959, in a letter to Kazan, he writes, "Some day you will know how much I value the great things you did with my work, how you lifted it above its measure by your great gift."

Among Kazan's other films were Panic in the Streets (1950), East of Eden (1955), Baby Doll (1956), Wild River (1960), and The Last Tycoon (1976).

Directing style

Preference for unknown actors
Kazan strove for "cinematic realism", a quality he often achieved by discovering and working with unknown actors, many of whom treated him as their mentor, which gave him the flexibility to depict "social reality with both accuracy and vivid intensity". He also felt that casting the right actors accounted for 90% of a movie's ultimate success or failure. As a result of his efforts, he also gave actors such as Lee Remick, Jo Van Fleet, Warren Beatty, Andy Griffith, James Dean and Jack Palance, their first major movie roles. He explained to director and producer George Stevens Jr. that he felt that "big stars are barely trained or not very well trained. They also have bad habits ... they're not pliable anymore." Kazan also describes how and why he gets to know his actors on a personal level:

Kazan goes on to describe how he got to understand James Dean, as an example:

Topics of personal and social realism
Kazan chose his subjects to express personal and social events that he was familiar with. He described his thought process before taking on a project:

Film historian Joanna E. Rapf notes that among the methods Kazan used in his work with actors, was his initial focus on "reality", although his style was not defined as "naturalistic". She adds: "He respects his script, but casts and directs with a particular eye for expressive action and the use of emblematic objects." Kazan stated that "unless the character is somewhere in the actor himself, you shouldn't cast him."

In his later years he changed his mind about some of the philosophy behind the Group Theatre, in that he no longer felt that the theater was a
"collective art", as he once believed:

Film author Peter Biskind described Kazan's career as "fully committed to art and politics, with the politics feeding the work". Kazan, however, has downplayed that impression:

Nonetheless, there have been clear messages in some of his films that involved politics in various ways. In 1954, he directed On the Waterfront, written by screenwriter Budd Schulberg, which was a film about union corruption in New York. Some critics consider it "one of the greatest films in the history of international cinema". Another political film was A Face in the Crowd (1957). His protagonist, played by Andy Griffith (in his film debut) is not a politician, yet his career suddenly becomes deeply involved in politics. According to film author Harry Keyishian, Kazan and screenwriter Budd Schulberg were using the film to warn audiences about the dangerous potential of the new medium of television. Kazan explains that he and Schulberg were trying to warn "of the power TV would have in the political life of the nation". Kazan states, "Listen to what the candidate says; don't be taken in by his charm or his trust-inspiring personality. Don't buy the advertisement; buy what's in the package."

Use of "method" acting

As a product of the Group Theatre and Actors Studio, he was most noted for his use of "Method" actors, especially Brando and Dean. During an interview in 1988, Kazan said, "I did whatever was necessary to get a good performance including so-called Method acting. I made them run around the set, I scolded them, I inspired jealousy in their girlfriends ... The director is a desperate beast! ... You don't deal with actors as dolls. You deal with them as people who are poets to a certain degree." Actor Robert De Niro called him a "master of a new kind of psychological and behavioral faith in acting."

Kazan was aware of the limited range of his directing abilities:

He explained that he tried to inspire his actors to offer ideas:

Kazan, however, held strong ideas about the scenes and would try to merge an actor's suggestions and inner feelings with his own. Despite the strong eroticism created in Baby Doll, for example, he set limits. Before shooting a seduction scene between Eli Wallach and Carroll Baker, he privately asked Wallach, "Do you think you actually go through with seducing that girl?" Wallach writes, "I hadn't thought about that question before, but I answered ... 'No'." Kazan replies, "Good idea, play it that way." Kazan, many years later, explained his rationale for scenes in that film:

Being an "actor's director"

Joanna Rapf adds that Kazan was most admired for his close work with actors, noting that director Nicholas Ray considered him "the best actor's director the United States has ever produced". Film historian Foster Hirsch explains that "he created virtually a new acting style, which was the style of the Method ... [that] allowed for the actors to create great depth of psychological realism."

Among the actors who describe Kazan as an important influence in their career were Patricia Neal, who co-starred with Andy Griffith in A Face in the Crowd (1957): "He was very good. He was an actor and he knew how we acted. He would come and talk to you privately. I liked him a lot." Anthony Franciosa, a supporting actor in the film, explains how Kazan encouraged his actors:

However, in order to get quality acting from Andy Griffith, in his first screen appearance, and achieve what Schickel calls "an astonishing movie debut", Kazan would often take surprising measures. In one important and highly emotional scene, for example, Kazan had to give Griffith fair warning: "I may have to use extraordinary means to make you do this. I may have to get out of line. I don't know any other way of getting an extraordinary performance out of an actor."

Actress Terry Moore calls Kazan her "best friend", and notes that "he made you feel better than you thought you could be. I never had another director that ever touched him. I was spoiled for life." "He would find out if your life was like the character", says Carroll Baker, star of Baby Doll; "he was the best director with actors."

Kazan's need to remain close to his actors continued up to his last film, The Last Tycoon (1976). He remembered that Robert De Niro, the star of the film, "would do almost anything to succeed", and even cut his weight down from 170 to 128 pounds for the role. Kazan adds that De Niro "is one of a select number of actors I've directed who work hard at their trade, and the only one who asked to rehearse on Sundays. Most of the others play tennis. Bobby and I would go over the scenes to be shot."

The powerful dramatic roles Kazan brought out from many of his actors was due, partly, to his ability to recognize their personal character traits. Although he did not know De Niro before this film, for example, Kazan later writes, "Bobby is more meticulous ... he's very imaginative. He's very precise. He figures everything out both inside and outside. He has good emotion. He's a character actor: everything he does he calculates. In a good way, but he calculates." Kazan developed and used those personality traits for his character in the film. Although the film did poorly at the box office, some reviewers praised De Niro's acting. Film critic Marie Brenner writes that "for De Niro, it is a role that surpasses even his brilliant and daring portrayal of Vito Corleone in The Godfather, part II, ... [his] performance deserves to be compared with the very finest."

Marlon Brando, in his autobiography, goes into detail about the influence Kazan had on his acting:

HCUA testimony

Kazan testified before the House Committee on Un-American Activities (HCUA) in 1952, during the postwar era that journalist Michael Mills calls "arguably the most controversial period in Hollywood history". When Kazan was in his mid-20s, during the Depression years 1934 to 1936, he had been a member of the American Communist Party in New York for a year and a half.

In April 1952, the Committee called on Kazan, under oath, to identify Communists from that period 16 years earlier. Kazan initially refused to provide names, but eventually named eight former Group Theatre members who he said had been Communists: Clifford Odets, J. Edward Bromberg, Lewis Leverett, Morris Carnovsky, Phoebe Brand, Tony Kraber, Ted Wellman, and Paula Miller, who later married Lee Strasberg. He testified that Odets quit the party at the same time that he did. Kazan said all the persons named were already known to HCUA, although this has been contested. Kazan recounts how he received a letter detailing how his naming of Art Smith damaged the actor's career. Kazan's naming names cost him many friends within the film industry, including playwright Arthur Miller, although Kazan notes the two did work together again.

Kazan would later write in his autobiography of the "warrior pleasure at withstanding his enemies". When Kazan received an Honorary Academy Award in 1999, the audience was noticeably divided in their reaction, with some, including Nick Nolte, Ed Harris, Ian McKellen, and Amy Madigan, refusing to applaud, and others, such as actors Kathy Bates, Meryl Streep, Karl Malden, and Warren Beatty, and producer George Stevens Jr., standing and applauding. Stevens speculates on why he, Beatty, and many others in the audience chose to stand and applaud:

In 1982, Orson Welles was asked a question about Kazan at the Cinémathèque française in Paris. Welles replied, "Chère mademoiselle, you have chosen the wrong metteur en scène, because Elia Kazan is a traitor. He is a man who sold to McCarthy all his companions at a time when he could continue to work in New York at high salary, and having sold all his people to McCarthy, he then made a film called On the Waterfront which was a celebration of the informer."

Los Angeles Times film critic Kenneth Turan wrote "The only criterion for an award like this is the work". Kazan was already "denied accolades" from the American Film Institute, and other film critics' associations. According to Mills, "It's time for the Academy to recognize this genius", adding that "We applauded when the great Chaplin finally had his hour." In response, former vice president of the Los Angeles Film Critics Association, Joseph McBride, claimed that an honorary award recognizes "the totality of what he represents, and Kazan's career, post 1952, was built on the ruin of other people's careers."

In later interviews, Kazan explained some of the early events that made him decide to become a friendly witness, most notably in relation to the Group Theatre, which he called his first "family", and the "best thing professionally" that ever happened to him:

Mills notes that prior to becoming a "friendly witness", Kazan discussed the issues with Miller:

Miller put his arm around Kazan and retorted, "Don't worry about what I'll think. Whatever you do is okay with me, because I know that your heart is in the right place."

In his memoirs, Kazan writes that his testimony meant that "the big shot had become the outsider". He also notes that it strengthened his friendship with another outsider, Tennessee Williams, with whom he collaborated on numerous plays and films. He called Williams "the most loyal and understanding friend I had through those black months".

Kazan appears as a character in Names, Mark Kemble's play about former Group Theatre members' struggles with the House Un-American Activities Committee.

Personal life and death

Kazan was married three times. His first wife was playwright Molly Day Thacher. They were married from 1932 until her death in 1963; this marriage produced two daughters and two sons, including screenwriter Nicholas Kazan. His second marriage, to the actress Barbara Loden, lasted from 1967 until her death in 1980, and produced one son. His marriage, in 1982, to Frances Rudge continued until his death, in 2003, aged 94.

In the early 1930s, Kazan and his wife moved into an 1885 farmhouse in Sandy Hook, Connecticut where they raised their four children. They continued to use the property as a summer and weekend retreat until 1998 when the property was put up for sale.

In 1978, the U.S. government paid for Kazan and his family to travel to Kazan's birthplace where many of his films were to be shown. During a speech in Athens, he discussed his films and his personal and business life in the U.S., along with the messages he tried to convey:

He also offered his opinions about the role of the U.S. as a world model for democracy:

Kazan died from natural causes in his Manhattan apartment, September 28, 2003, aged 94.

Filmography

Documentary
People of the Cumberland (1937) 
Watchtower Over Tomorrow (1945)

As an actor
City for Conquest (1940) 
Blues in the Night (1941)

Awards and nominations

In addition to these awards, Kazan has a star on the Hollywood Walk of Fame, which is located on 6800 Hollywood Boulevard. He is also a member of the American Theater Hall of Fame.

Directed Academy Award Performances

Legacy

Kazan became known as an "actor's director" because he was able to elicit some of the best performances in the careers of many of his stars. Under his direction, his actors received 24 Academy Award nominations and won nine Oscars.

He won as Best Director for Gentleman's Agreement (1947) and for On the Waterfront (1954). Both A Streetcar Named Desire (1951) and On the Waterfront were nominated for twelve Academy Awards, respectively winning four and eight.

With his many years with the Group Theatre and Actors Studio in New York City and later triumphs on Broadway, he became famous "for the power and intensity of his actors' performances". He was the pivotal figure in launching the film careers of Marlon Brando, James Dean, Julie Harris, Eli Wallach, Eva Marie Saint, Warren Beatty, Lee Remick, Karl Malden, and many others. Seven of Kazan's films won a total of 20 Academy Awards. Dustin Hoffman commented that he "doubted whether he, Robert De Niro, or Al Pacino, would have become actors without Mr. Kazan's influence."

Upon his death, at the age of 94, The New York Times described him as "one of the most honored and influential directors in Broadway and Hollywood history". Death of a Salesman and A Streetcar Named Desire, two plays he directed, are considered to be some of the greatest of the 20th century. Although he became a respected director on Broadway, he made an equally impressive transition into one of the major film directors of his time. Critic William Baer notes that throughout his career "he constantly rose to the challenge of his own aspirations", adding that "he was a pioneer and visionary who greatly affected the history of both stage and cinema". Certain of his film-related material and personal papers are contained in the Wesleyan University Cinema Archives to which scholars and media experts from around the world may have full access.

His controversial stand during his testimony in front of the House Committee on Un-American Activities (HCUA) in 1952 became the low point in his career, although he remained convinced that he made the right decision to give the names of Communist Party members. He stated in an interview in 1976 that "I would rather do what I did than crawl in front of a ritualistic Left and lie the way those other comrades did, and betray my own soul. I didn't betray it. I made a difficult decision."

During his career, Kazan won both Tony and Oscar Awards for directing on stage and screen. In 1982, President Ronald Reagan presented him with the Kennedy Center honors award, a national tribute for lifetime achievement in the arts. At the ceremony, screenwriter Budd Schulberg, who wrote On the Waterfront, thanked his lifelong friend saying, "Elia Kazan has touched us all with his capacity to honor not only the heroic man, but the hero in every man."

In 1999, at the 71st Academy Awards, Martin Scorsese and Robert De Niro presented the Honorary Oscar to Kazan. This would be a controversial pick for the Academy of Motion Pictures Arts and Sciences due to Kazan's history regarding his involvement with the Hollywood Blacklist in the 1950s. Several members of the audience including Nick Nolte and Ed Harris refused to applaud Kazan when he received the award while others such as Warren Beatty, Meryl Streep, Kathy Bates, and Kurt Russell gave him a standing ovation.

Martin Scorsese directed a film documentary, A Letter to Elia (2010), considered to be an "intensely personal and deeply moving tribute" to Kazan. Scorsese was "captivated" by Kazan's films as a young man, and the documentary mirrors his own life story while he also credits Kazan as the inspiration for his becoming a filmmaker. It won a Peabody Award in 2010.

Bibliography
 
 
 
  Originally published in 1973 by Secker and Warburg, London.

See also

References

Further reading

External links

 
 
 Method Man: Elia Kazan's Singular Career by John Lahr in The New Yorker (A Critic at Large)
 Assessing Kazan: His Life and Choice (NYT Books of the Times)
 Some notes on Kazan, HCUAh, and the aftermath of his testimony including his April 13, 1952 statement in The New York Times
 Literature on Elia Kazan

1909 births
2003 deaths
20th-century American male actors
20th-century American male writers
20th-century American memoirists
20th-century American screenwriters
Academy Honorary Award recipients
American anti-communists
American film producers
American male film actors
American male screenwriters
American theatre directors
American writers of Greek descent
Best Directing Academy Award winners
Best Director Golden Globe winners
Broadway theatre directors
Broadway theatre producers
Cappadocian Greeks
Directors Guild of America Award winners
Donaldson Award winners
Emigrants from the Ottoman Empire to the United States
Film directors from New York (state)
Golden Globe Award-winning producers
Honorary Golden Bear recipients
Juilliard School alumni
Kazan family
Kennedy Center honorees
Male actors from New Rochelle, New York
Screenwriters from New York (state)
Tony Award winners
Williams College alumni
Writers from New Rochelle, New York
Yale School of Drama alumni
New Rochelle High School alumni